Sokolniki was a town in Novomoskovsky District of Tula Oblast, Russia, located  east of Tula. On October 24, 2008, it was merged with the town of Novomoskovsk, with its territory re-organized as a microdistrict. Population:

History
The village of Sokolniki had existed in the region since at least the 19th century. The name originates from the last name Sokolnikov.

It was formed as a settlement in 1949, and was granted urban-type settlement status in 1954. Town status was granted to it in 1958.

Brown coal was mined in the town until the 1990s.

References

Geography of Tula Oblast
Defunct towns in Russia
Cities and towns built in the Soviet Union
Populated places established in 1949
Populated places disestablished in 2008
1949 establishments in the Soviet Union
2008 disestablishments in Russia